Johann Gerhard Husheer (26 July 1864 – 30 November 1954) was a New Zealand tobacco industry pioneer and processor, industrialist, philanthropist. He was born in Bremen, Germany on 26 July 1864 to a family of Dutch heritage. His grandfather, born in 1737 was a seaman and trader who, when returning after a voyage learned that the French had begun to occupy his home port, left Rotterdam for Bremen, Germany. Husheer was the first to plant tobacco in Motueka and became very wealthy. He lived in Napier for much of his life. After the 1931 Hawke's Bay earthquake, he commissioned Louis Hay to design a new frontage for his National Tobacco Company Building, one of the most elegant commercial buildings in Napier, and registered as a Category I structure by Heritage New Zealand. In 1956 it was purchased by Rothmans Tobacco Company.

References

1864 births
1954 deaths
New Zealand philanthropists
German emigrants to New Zealand